The Loneliest Planet is a 2011 German-American film written and directed by Julia Loktev, starring Gael García Bernal, Hani Furstenberg, and Georgian actor Bidzina Gujabidze. The plot centers around a young couple who travel with a local guide through a twisted backpacking trip across the Georgian wilderness.

The film had its international premiere at the 2011 Locarno International Film Festival followed by its North American premiere at the 2011 Toronto International Film Festival. It then went on to be featured during the New York Film Festival, the BFI London Film Festival, and the 2011 AFI Fest in Los Angeles, where it won the Grand Jury Prize. On March 24, 2012, The Loneliest Planet was awarded the top prize of "Lady Harimaguada de Oro" (The Golden Lady) at the Las Palmas de Gran Canaria International Film Festival, where actress Hani Furstenberg also won for Best Actress. On April 14, 2012, the film also won the Golden Tulip International Competition award at the 31st International Istanbul Film Festival.

On October 11, 2011, it was announced that Sundance Selects, a division of IFC Films, had acquired North American distribution rights. The film's theatrical release in the United States was on October 26, 2012.

The film is adapted from McSweeney's writer Tom Bissell's short story "Expensive Trips Nowhere," published in his collection God Lives in St. Petersburg.

Plot 
Alex (Gael García Bernal) and Nica (Hani Furstenberg) are in love and engaged to be married. They are seasoned travelers on a trip in the country of Georgia, formerly a republic of the Soviet Union. They hire a local guide (Bidzina Gujabidze) to take them backpacking through the breathtaking scenery of the Caucasus Mountains.

While on their journey, they meet an older man with two boys on their route; he is suspicious of the two foreigners. After a short conversation with their guide, the older man suddenly aims a hunting rifle aggressively at Alex and Nica at point-blank range.  For a moment, Alex's reaction is to shield himself behind Nica. He immediately regains his composure and pushes himself in front of Nica to face the stranger's gun, while their guide in turn persuades the stranger to lower his gun and go on his way. A seemingly traumatized Nica walks away on her own.

A few scenes show the couple not speaking or walking together while on their journey to the mountains, although Alex repeatedly attempts to reconnect with Nica. At one point, they cross a stream where Nica accidentally falls only to be saved by the local guide. Alex tries to offer a shivering Nica some help, but she rebuffs him. At night, the local guide tells Nica the story of his failed marriage, and they kiss. Soon after, Nica returns to Alex and the couple have sex. At dawn, the trio start packing up their camps, and it remains ambiguous as to whether or not the couple have finally reconciled.

Cast 
 Gael García Bernal as Alex
 Hani Furstenberg as Nica
 Bidzina Gujabidze as local guide
 Amiran Gudrshauri as kebab seller

Reception 
The film was well-received by critics. The film holds a "certified fresh" approval rating of 70% on review aggregator Rotten Tomatoes, based on 62 reviews with an average of 6.9/10. The website's critical consensus reads, "The source material that inspired The Loneliest Planet may be brief, but this adaptation of a Tom Bissell short story compensates with studious, finely detailed filmmaking, haunting visuals, and thought-provoking subtext." On Metacritic, the film has a weighted average score of 76 out of 100, based on 19 critics, indicating "generally favorable reviews".

A.O. Scott of The New York Times called The Loneliest Planet, "gripping and haunting, but also coy and elusive."
Roger Ebert of the Chicago Sun-Times gave it 2 out of 4 and wrote: "All of this grows tiresome. We're given no particular reason at the outset of The Loneliest Planet to care about these people, our interest doesn't grow along the way, the landscape grows repetitive...."

References

External links 
 

2011 films
German thriller drama films
English-language German films
2010s Georgian-language films
Films set in Georgia (country)
2010s English-language films
American thriller drama films
2010s American films
2010s German films
2011 multilingual films
American multilingual films
German multilingual films